In Serbia, the standard time is Central European Time (CET; UTC+01:00). Daylight saving time is observed from the last Sunday in March (02:00 CET) to the last Sunday in October (03:00 CEST). Serbia adopted CET in 1884.

Time notation 

The 24-hour clock is almost exclusively used in writing, while spoken language is dominated by the 12-hour clock, usually without noting whether the hour is a.m. or p.m. – that information is derived from the context.

IANA time zone database 
In the IANA time zone database, Serbia is given the zone Europe/Belgrade.

See also 
Time in Europe
Time in Kosovo
Time in Albania
Time in Bosnia and Herzegovina

References

External links 
Current time in Serbia at Time.is